Pasquale Ricci may refer to:
Francesco Pasquale Ricci (1732–1817), Italian composer
Giuseppe Pasquale Ricci (died 1791), government official in the Habsburg port of Trieste